In the semiotic theories of Jakob von Uexküll and Thomas A. Sebeok, umwelt (plural: umwelten; from the German Umwelt meaning "environment" or "surroundings") is the "biological foundations that lie at the very center of the study of both communication and signification in the human [and non-human] animal". The term is usually translated as "self-centered world". Uexküll theorised that organisms can have different umwelten, even though they share the same environment. The term umwelt, together with companion terms Umgebung (an Umwelt as seen by another observer) and Innenwelt (the mapping of the self to the world of objects), have special relevance for cognitive philosophers, roboticists and cyberneticians because they offer a potential solution to the conundrum of the infinite regress of the Cartesian Theater.

Discussion

Each functional component of an umwelt has a meaning that represents the organism's model of the world. These functional components correspond approximately to perceptual features, as described by Anne Treisman. It is also the semiotic world of the organism, including all the meaningful aspects of the world for any particular organism. It can be water, food, shelter, potential threats or points of reference for navigation. An organism creates and reshapes its own umwelt when it interacts with the world. This is termed a 'functional circle'. The umwelt theory states that the mind and the world are inseparable because it is the mind that interprets the world for the organism. Because of the individuality and uniqueness of the history of every single organism, the umwelten of different organisms differ. When two umwelten interact, this creates a semiosphere.

As a term, umwelt also unites all the semiotic processes of an organism into a whole. Internally, an organism is the sum of its parts operating in functional circles and, to survive, all the parts must work cooperatively. This is termed the "collective umwelt" which models the organism as a centralised system from the cellular level upward. This requires the semiosis of any one part to be continuously connected to any other semiosis operating within the same organism. If anything disrupts this process, the organism will not operate efficiently.

Uexküll's writings show a specific interest in the various worlds that he believed to exist ('conceptually') from the point of view of the umwelt of different creatures such as ticks, sea urchins, amoebae, jellyfish, and sea worms.

The biosemiotic turn in Jakob von Uexküll's analysis occurs in his discussion of the animal's relationship with its environment. The umwelt is for him an environment-world which is, according to Agamben, "constituted by a more or less broad series of elements [called] 'carriers of significance' or 'marks' which are the only things that interest the animal". Agamben goes on to paraphrase Uexküll's example of the tick, saying:
"...this eyeless animal finds the way to her watchpoint [at the top of a tall blade of grass] with the help of only its skin’s general sensitivity to light. The approach of her prey becomes apparent to this blind and deaf bandit only through her sense of smell. The odor of butyric acid, which emanates from the sebaceous follicles of all mammals, works on the tick as a signal that causes her to abandon her post (on top of the blade of grass/bush) and fall blindly downward toward her prey. If she is fortunate enough to fall on something warm (which she perceives by means of an organ sensible to a precise temperature) then she has attained her prey, the warm-blooded animal, and thereafter needs only the help of her sense of touch to find the least hairy spot possible and embed herself up to her head in the cutaneous tissue of her prey. She can now slowly suck up a stream of warm blood."

Thus, for the tick, the umwelt is reduced to only three (biosemiotic) carriers of significance: (1) the odor of butyric acid, which emanates from the sebaceous follicles of all mammals; (2) the temperature of 37°C (corresponding to the blood of all mammals); and (3) the hairy topography of mammals.

Critics
Uexküll's application of the notion of "umwelt" to the human person has been contested. In "Welt und Umwelt" and "Die Wahrheit der Dinge", the philosopher and sociologist Josef Pieper argued that reason allows the human person to live in "Welt" (world) while plants and animals do indeed live in an Umwelt—a notion he traces back far beyond Uexküll to Plato, Aristotle, and Thomas Aquinas.

See also

References

Further reading
 
 Naming Natureby Carol Kaesuk Yoon
 
 View from the Oak by Herbert and Judith Kohl The New Press | https://thenewpress.com/books/view-from-oak
 An Immense World by Ed Yong Penguin books Vintage | https://www.penguin.co.uk/books/440513/an-immense-world-by-yong-ed/9781847926081

External links
Umwelt by John Deely
Umwelt and Phenomenology 
Umwelt and semiosphere by Kalevi Kull
Pragmatism and Umwelt-theory by Alexei Sharov
TDE-R - A Subjective Biocomputer by Charles Dyer

Semiotics
Neuroethology concepts
Existential therapy